The 2007–08 AL-Bank Ligaen season was the 51st season of ice hockey in Denmark. Ten teams participated in the league, and Herning IK won the championship.

Regular season

Playoffs

External links
Season on Hockeyarchives.info

Dan
2007 in Danish sport
2008 in Danish sport